John Salvatore Romita (born August 17, 1956), known professionally as John Romita Jr., is an American comics artist best known for his extensive work for Marvel Comics from the 1970s to the 2010s. He is the son of artist John Romita Sr.

Early life
John Romita Jr. is the son of Virginia (Bruno) and comic book artist John Romita Sr., one of the signature Spider-Man artists since the 1960s. He studied advertising art and design at Farmingdale State College in East Farmingdale, New York, graduating in 1976.

Career
Romita Jr.'s first contribution to Marvel Comics was at the age of 13 with the creation of the Prowler in The Amazing Spider-Man #78 (Nov. 1969). Romita Jr. began his career at Marvel UK, doing sketches for covers of reprints. His American debut was with a six-page story entitled "Chaos at the Coffee Bean!" in The Amazing Spider-Man Annual #11 (1977).

Romita's early popularity began with his run on Iron Man with writer David Michelinie and artist Bob Layton which began in 1978. The creative team introduced several supporting characters, including Tony Stark's bodyguard girlfriend Bethany Cabe and rival industrialist Justin Hammer. In the early 1980s, he had his first regular run on the series The Amazing Spider-Man and also was the artist for the launch of the Dazzler series. He and writer Dennis O'Neil introduced Madame Web in The Amazing Spider-Man #210 (Nov. 1980) and Hydro-Man in issue #212 (Jan. 1981). In 1982, Romita Jr. drew Marvel Super Hero Contest of Champions the first limited series published by Marvel Comics. Working with writer Roger Stern on The Amazing Spider-Man, he co-created the character Hobgoblin. From 1983 to 1986 he had a run on the Uncanny X-Men with Dan Green and author Chris Claremont and co-created Forge. Romita has downplayed the significance of his run, saying that few of the characters introduced during this time were co-created by him and that his style has had no discernible influence on succeeding X-Men artists. His relationship with Claremont was rather cool at the time, as Claremont did not like his work as much as the artists he had previously worked with. He would return for a second run on Uncanny X-Men in 1993, which he said he liked better "because of getting to work with [writer] Scott Lobdell."

From 1988 to 1990, Romita had an extended stint on Daredevil with writer Ann Nocenti and inker Al Williamson, which included the creation of long-running Daredevil nemesis Typhoid Mary. For Romita himself, his stint on Daredevil was most significant for being both the first time he was allowed to do full pencils instead of just breakdowns, and the first time he had a working relationship with the writer on a series. He later remarked that "I finally felt like I was part of the creation process for the first time while I was on DD." After Daredevil #282, Romita left the series to pursue other projects.

Stan Lee interviewed Romita and his father in Episode 8 of the 1991–1992 documentary series The Comic Book Greats.

He worked on a host of Marvel titles during the 1990s, including a return to Iron Man for the second "Armor Wars" story arc, written by John Byrne; The Punisher War Zone; the Cable miniseries; and the Punisher/Batman crossover. Klaus Janson was a frequent inker. Romita collaborated with Frank Miller on a Daredevil origin story entitled Daredevil: The Man Without Fear in 1993, a revisiting of the character's origin, with Williamson again on inks. Romita had to draw new transitional pages as the story changed formats from a 64-page graphic novel to a 144-page graphic novel to a five-issue limited series. Dan Jurgens and Romita Jr. relaunched the Thor series in July 1998 while a January 1999 reboot of Peter Parker: Spider-Man was handled by Howard Mackie and Romita Jr.

In 2001, Romita returned to Spider-Man for a collaboration with writer J. Michael Straczynski beginning with The Amazing Spider-Man vol. 2 #30 (June 2001). The creative team produced a story for issue #36 (Dec. 2001) that served as memorial to the victims of the September 11 attacks. He drew Marvel's Wolverine with author Mark Millar. In 2004, Romita's creator-owned project The Gray Area was published by Image Comics. He subsequently worked on the Marvel series Black Panther, The Sentry and "Ultimate Vision", a backup feature in the Ultimate Marvel line, written by Mark Millar.

In 2006, Romita collaborated with writer Neil Gaiman on a seven-issue miniseries reinterpretation of Jack Kirby's characters the Eternals. Romita worked with Greg Pak on the five-issue central miniseries of Marvel's 2007 crossover storyline, "World War Hulk".

In 2008, Romita again returned to The Amazing Spider-Man. He also collaborated once more with Millar, for a creator-owned series, Kick-Ass, published by Marvel's Icon imprint. This was later adapted into the 2010 film Kick-Ass. Romita, one of the producers, directed an animated flashback sequence in the film.

On April 9, 2011, Romita was one of 62 comics creators who appeared at the IGN stage at the Kapow! convention in London to set two Guinness World Records, the "Fastest Production of a Comic Book" and "Most Contributors to a Comic Book". With Guinness officials on hand to monitor their progress, writer Millar began work at 9 a.m. scripting a 20-page black-and-white comic book of his character Superior, with Romita and the other artists appearing on stage throughout the day to work on the pencils, inks, and lettering, each drawing a panel. The book was completed in 11 hours, 19 minutes, and 38 seconds, and was published through Icon on November 23, 2011, with all royalties being donated to Yorkhill Children's Foundation.

On May 4, 2012, Romita set out to break his own record for continuous cartooning, to support the charity Candlelighters Childhood Cancer Foundation of Nevada. He attempted to continuously sketch characters and sign comics for 50 hours straight.

In 2014, Romita Jr. became the penciller of the DC Comics flagship title Superman, starting with issue #32, in collaboration with writer Geoff Johns. Romita Jr.'s Superman pencils have been inked by Klaus Janson. In 2016, Romita Jr. and writer Scott Snyder collaborated on the All-Star Batman series as part of the DC Rebirth relaunch. Romita Jr. and writer Dan Abnett created The Silencer series as part of DC's "Dark Metal" line. In addition, Romita worked with Frank Miller on the Superman: Year One mini-series.

In 2020, Romita drew Kelly Sue DeConnick's story "Fore" for Detective Comics 1027th issue.

Influences and techniques
Romita's art influences include his father John Romita Sr., as well as comics artists Jack Kirby and John Buscema, the Wyeth family of painters, and illustrator Charles Dana Gibson.

Having illustrated both gritty street-level stories of characters such as Spider-Man and Daredevil and cosmic stories such as those starring Thor, Romita says he prefers the former, because "that is where I grew up. I use the same approach to each of the different story types – the story tells me what to do." He prefers to work in the Marvel Method. He considers The Man Without Fear to be his best work, due to the strong storytelling and the quality of the story.

Awards
John Romita Jr. received an Inkpot Award in 1994.

With writer J. Michael Straczynski and inker Scott Hanna, Romita Jr. won a 2002 Eisner Award for Best Serialized Story: The Amazing Spider-Man #30-35: "Coming Home".

Bibliography

DC Comics
Action Comics #1017–1028 (2019–2020)
All-Star Batman #1–5 (2016)
Batman vol. 3 #80–81 (2019)
Batman Black and White vol. 5 #6 (among other artists, 2021)
Dark Days: The Casting #1 (one-shot, with Jim Lee and Andy Kubert, 2017)
Dark Days: The Forge #1 (one-shot, with Lee and Kubert, 2017)
Dark Knight III: The Master Race #3 (backup story, 2016)
Dark Knight Returns: The Last Crusade (one-shot, 2016)
Detective Comics #1027 (among other artists, 2020)
The Silencer #1–3 (2018)
Suicide Squad vol. 4 #11–15 (2017)
Superman vol. 3 #32–44 (2014–2015)
Superman: Year One #1–3 (2019)

Image Comics
The Gray Area #1–3 (2004)
Kick-Ass #1–6 (2008)

Marvel Comics
The Amazing Spider-Man #208, 210–218, 223–227, 229–236, 238–250, 290–291, 432, 500–508, 568–573, 584–585, 587–588, 600, 692, Annual #11, 16 (1980–1984, 1987, 1995, 1998, 2003–2004, 2008–2009, 2012)
The Amazing Spider-Man vol. 2, #22–27, 30–58 (2000–2003)
The Amazing Spider-Man vol. 6 #1-5, 7-8, 11-13 (2022-)
The Avengers vol. 3 #35 (2000)
The Avengers vol. 4 #1–12, 14, 16–17 (2010–2011)
Black Panther vol. 3, #1–6 (2005)
Cable: Blood and Metal #1–2 (miniseries, 1992)
Captain America vol. 7, #1–10 (2013)
Daredevil #250–257, 259–263, 265–276, 278–282, Annual #5 (1988–1990)
Daredevil: The Man Without Fear #1-5 (1993–1994)
Dark Reign: The List – Punisher #1 (2009)
Dazzler #1–3 (1981)
Eternals vol. 3 #1–7 (2006–2007)
Fall of the Hulks: Gamma #1 (2010)
Fallen Son: The Death of Captain America #4 (2007)
Fantastic Four vol. 6 #35 (2021)
Free Comic Book Day 2010: Iron Man/Thor #1 (2010)
Ghost Rider/Wolverine/Punisher: Hearts of Darkness #1 (1991)
Heroes for Hope Starring the X-Men #1 (1985)
The Incredible Hulk vol. 3 #24–25, 27–28, 34–39 (2001–2002)
Iron Man #115–117, 119–121, 123–128, 141–150, 152–156, 256, 258–266 (1978–1982, 1990–1991)
The Last Fantastic Four Story (2007)
Marvel Super Hero Contest of Champions #1-3 (1982)
Marvel Super Special #5 (Kiss) (1978)
The Mighty Avengers #15 (2008)
Peter Parker: Spider-Man #57, 64–76, 78–84, 86–92, 94–95, 97–98 (1995–1998)
Peter Parker: Spider-Man vol. 2, #1–3, 6–12, 14–17, 19 (1999–2000)
The Punisher War Zone #1–8 (1992)
Scarlet Spider #2 (1995)
Sentry vol. 2 #1–8 (miniseries, 2005–2006)
The Spectacular Spider-Man #50, 121 (1981, 1986)
Spider-Man: The Lost Years #0, 1–3 (miniseries, 1995)
Star Brand #1–2, 4–7 (1986–1987)
Thor vol. 2, #1–8, 10–13, 16–18, 21–25 (1998–2000)
Ultimate Vision #0 (2007)
Uncanny X-Men #175–185, 187–197, 199–200, 202–203, 206–211, 287, 300–302, 304, 306–311, Annual #4 (1980–1986, 1992–1994)
Wolverine vol. 3, #20–31 (2004–2005)
World War Hulk #1–5 (2007–2008)
X-Men: Legacy #208 (2008)
X-Men Unlimited #7 (1994)

Icon Comics
Hit-Girl #1–5 (2012–2013)
Kick-Ass #1–8 (with writer Mark Millar 2008–2010)
Kick-Ass 2 #1–7 (2010–2012)
Kick-Ass 3 #1–8 (2013–2014)

Marvel Comics/DC Comics
Punisher/Batman: Deadly Knights (intercompany crossover, 1994)
Thorion of the New Asgods #1 (1997)

References

Further reading

External links

 
 John Romita Jr. on Marvel.com
 John Romita Jr. at Mike's Amazing World of Comics
 John Romita Jr. at the Unofficial Handbook of Marvel Comics Creators

1956 births
Living people
American comics artists
Artists from New York City
American people of Italian descent
Farmingdale State College alumni
Inkpot Award winners
Marvel Comics people